Organized by Slow Food, the Region of Piedmont and the City of Turin, Terra Madre Salone del Gusto is an international gastronomy exhibition that takes places every two years in Turin, bringing together food producers and artisans from across the world. The event is composed of a large market and other activities including conferences, forums, workshops, tastings and cooking lessons.

History

The first edition of Salone del Gusto was in 1996, at the Lingotto Fiere conference center. From 2004, a parallel event took place alongside, Terra Madre, a gathering of Slow Food's food communities from around the globe, composed of people who produce, transform and distribute food according to principles of environmental sustainability and the maintenance of traditional knowledge.

From 2012 Salone del Gusto and Terra Madre were combined in a single event; in 2016 the event's name reflects the primacy of Terra Madre, becoming Terra Madre Salone del Gusto, and will for the first time be held outside Lingotto, across several different locations in Turin's city center, including: the Parco del Valentino, the Royal Palace of Turin, the Teatro Carignano, Eataly, around the streets and squares of the center, the Residences of the Royal House of Savoy and the Museo Egizio.

The theme of the 2016 edition was "Loving the Earth" (in Italian Voler bene alla terra).

See also
Slow Food
Piedmont
Turin

References

External links 
http://www.salonedelgusto.com/en/
http://www.terramadre.info/

Recurring events established in 1996
Culture in Turin
Cuisine of Piedmont
Events in Turin